State Highway 32 (SH-32) is a  state highway in Idaho. It runs from SH-33 to SH-47.

Route description
SH-32 begins at an intersection with SH-33 near the town of Tetonia. It makes a series of shallow turns, eventually heading due west, before turning north again and ending at SH-47, near the town of Ashton.

Major intersections

See also

 List of state highways in Idaho
 List of highways numbered 32

References

External links

032
Transportation in Teton County, Idaho
Transportation in Fremont County, Idaho